Lee Si Wang (born 17 July 1999) is a Hong Kong professional footballer who is currently a free agent.

Career statistics

Club

Notes

References

Living people
1999 births
Hong Kong footballers
Association football forwards
Hong Kong Premier League players
Yuen Long FC players
Hong Kong Rangers FC players